Krupnik is a thick Polish soup made from vegetable or meat broth, containing potatoes and barley groats (kasza jęczmienna, archaically called krupy - hence the name). Common additional ingredients include włoszczyzna (carrots, parsley, leek, and celery), onion, meat, and dried mushrooms.

References

Barley-based dishes
Polish soups